Magda Cârneci is a poet, essayist, and art historian born in Romania. She took a Ph.D. in art history at Ecole des Hautes Etudes en Sciences Sociales in Paris (1997) and received several international grants in literature and art history (Fulbrigt, Soros, Getty, European Community). Member of the well-known “generation of the ‘80s” in Romanian literature, of which she was one of the theoreticians, after the Revolution of December 1989 she became actively involved in the political and cultural Romanian scene of the 1990s. In the 2000s, after working as a visiting lecturer at the National Institute of Oriental Languages and Civilizations (INALCO) in Paris, she was the director of the Romanian Cultural Institute in Paris (2007 – 2010). At present, she is visiting professor at the National University of Arts in Bucharest, editor-in-chief of ARTA magazine for visual arts, and president of PEN Club Romania. She is also a member of the European Cultural Parliament.

She started her literary career in the România literară magazine, under the pen name Magdalena Ghica, which she used until 1989. She published numerous books of poetry, art criticism, and essays in Romanian and other languages, and her poems have been translated into many languages.

She is affiliated with several organizations, including:
 Founding member and present-day president of the Group for Social Dialogue (GDS), Bucharest
 Member of AICA International
 Member of PEN International; president of PEN Club Romania, 2011 -
 Member of European Cultural Parliament (ECP)
 Member of HGCEA (Historians of Central and East European Art), USA
 Member of CIRET (Centre international de recherches et etudes transdisciplinaires), Paris
 Member of Institut de Neuroconnectique, Paris
 Member of Union of Writers in Romania (USR), Bucharest
 Member of Union of Visual Artists in Romania (UAP), Bucharest

Works

Volumes of poetry in Romanian
 A Deafening Silence, Eminescu,Bucharest, 1985
 Chaosmos, Cartea Românească,Bucharest, 1992
 Political Poems, Axa, Botoșani, 2000
 Chaosmos and other Poems, anthology, Paralela 45, Bucharest, 2004
 TRANS Poems, Tracus Art, Bucharest, 2012

Poetry books in foreign languages
 Psaume, Marseille : Editions Autres Temps, 1997
 Poeme / Poems, Pitesti : Paralela 45 (in Romanian and English, translated by Adam J.Sorkin)
 Le paradis poétique, Paris : Transignum, 2004 (bibliophile book)
 Chaosmos. Gedichten, Jan Willem Bos translator, Amsterdam: Go-Bos Press, 2004
 Chaosmos. Poems, Adam J.Sorkin translator, Boston: White Pine Press, 2006
 Trois saisons poétiques, Luxembourg : éditions PHI, 2008
 Chaosmos, translated by Linda Maria Baros, Paris : Editions de Corlevour, 2013
 Oh, meine Generation, Dionysos Boppard, Rheinland-Pfalz - 2020, Trans: Christian W. Schenk Germany

Prose
 FEM, novel, Bucharest: Cartea Românească, 2011; second edition Polirom, 2014.

Texts in collective books in French
 Paris par écrit, Paris: L’Inventaire/Maison des Ecrivains, 2002
 Le sacré aujourd’hui, Paris: Editions du Rocher, 2003
 Transdisciplinarité - Un chemin vers la paix, Paris: Éditions FBV pour le CNRS, 2005
 La Mort aujourd’hui, Paris: Editions du Rocher, 2008
 Mon royaume pour un livre, Guy Rouquet editor, L’atelier imaginaire/ Le castor astrale, Paris, 2013.

Anthologies of poetry
 Nuovi poeti romeni, Marco Cugno and Marin Mincu editors, Florence: Vallecchi Editore, 1986 Incertitudes. Antologie de la poésie roumaine, Dan Deșliu editor, Quebec: Humanitas Nouvelle Qptique, 1992 Streiflicht: Eine Auswahl zeitgenossischer Rumänisher Lyrik, Christian W. Schenk editor, Kastellaun: Dionysos Verlag, 1994 Antologia di poesia mediteranea, Marco Cugno editor, Milano: Marzorati, Emanuele Bettini editore, 1996 Gefährliche Serpentinem. Rumänischer Lyric der Gegenwart, Dieter Schlesak editor, Berlin: Edition Druckhaus, 1998 Romania and Western Civilisation, Kurt W. Treptow editor, Iassi: The Center for Romanian Studies, 1998 Day after Night. Twenty Romanian poets for the Twentieth First Century, Gabriel Stănescu and Adam J. Sorkin editors, Norcross: Criterion Publishers, 1999 STRONG. 28 de poete din România: 28 poetek rumunskich, Denisa Comănescu editor, Bucharest: Universal Dalsi, 1998 Poètes roumains contemporains, Irina Petraș editor, Montréal/Bucharest: Les Ecrits des forges/Editura didactică și pedagogică, 2000 Speaking in Silence. Prose Poets of Contemporary Romania, Adam J.Sorkin and Bogdan Stefanescu editors, Bucharest: Paralela 45, 2001 Poetry is a Woman (11 Woman Poets from Romania), translation into Greek by Sandra Michalaki and Anna Sotrini, Athens: Alpha publishing house, 2006 Born in Utopia/ Născut în Utopia. An Anthology of Modern and Contemporary Romanian Poetry, edited by Carmen Firan and Paul Doru Mugur with Edward Foster, New Jersey: Talisman House Publishers, 2006 Poésies de langue française. 144 poètes d’aujourd’hui autour du monde. Anthologie établie par Stephane Bataillon, Bruno Doucey et Sylvestre Clancier, Paris: Seghers, 2008 Anthologie poétique. 109 poètes femmes contemporaines, sélection d’Angèle Paoli, Terre des femmes, 2010, 2014, p.74. http://terresdefemmes.blogs.com/anthologie_potique/anthologie-po%C3%A9tique-terres-de-femmesprintemps-des-po%C3%A8tes-2010-couleur-femme-.html Romanian Writers on Writing, Norman Manea editor, Trinity University Press, San Antonio, Texas, 2011 Testament - 400 Years of Romanian Poetry - 400 de ani de poezie românească - bilingual edition - Daniel Ioniță (editor and principal translator) with Daniel Reynaud, Adriana Paul & Eva Foster - Editura Minerva, 2019 - 
 Romanian Poetry from its Origins to the Present - bilingual edition English/Romanian - Daniel Ioniță (editor and principal translator) with Daniel Reynaud, Adriana Paul and Eva Foster - Australian-Romanian Academy Publishing - 2020 -  ; 

Art critiques

Essays
 Art of the 1980s. Texts on Postmodernism, Bucharest: Litera, 1996 (in Romanian) Art of the 1980s in Eastern Europe. Texts on Postmodernism, Pitesti: Paralela 45, 1999 (in English) Visual Arts in Romania 1945-1989, Bucharest: Meridiane, București, 2000 (in Romanian) Art et pouvoir en Roumanie 1945-1989, Paris: L’Harmattan, 2007 (in French) Visual Arts in Romania 1945-1989. With an Addenda 1990-2010, Bucharest: Polirom, 2013 (in Romanian)Monographs
 Ion Ţuculescu, Bucharest: Meridiane, 1984 (in Romanian) Lucian Grigorescu, Bucharest: Meridiane, 1989 (in Romanian)Texts in collective volumes
 Von der Bürokratie zur Telekratie, Berlin: Merve Verlag, 1990 (in German) A Latvany és Gondolat, Bucharest: Editura Kriterion, 1991 (in Hungarian) Bucharest in the 1920s-1940s: between Avant-Garde and Modernism, Bucharest: Simetria, 1994 (in Romanian and English) The Competition goes on. The 80s Generation in Theoretical Texts. An Anthology by Gh. Crăciun, Pitesti: Ed. Vlasie, 1994; second edition, Paralela 45, 1999 (in Romanian) The Moment of Truth. An Anthology by Iordan Chimet, Cluj-Napoca: Dacia, 1996 (in Romanian) Experiment in Romanian Arts after 1960, Bucharest: CSAC, 1997 (in Romanian and English) Culture of the Time of Transformation, Poznan: WIS Publishers, 1998 (in English and Polish) Encyclopedia of Eastern Europe. From the Congress of Vienna to the Fall of Communism, edited by Richard Frucht, Northwest Missouri State University, Garland Publishing, Inc., New York & London, 2000 European Contemporary Art. The Art of the Balkan Countries, Thessalonica, State Museum of Contemporary Art, 2002 Perspectives roumaines. Du post-communisme à l’intégration européenne, Catherine Durandin and Magda Carneci editors, Paris : L’Harmattan, 2004 European art criticism, Stuttgart, Badischer Kunstverein / AVAN network/ Culture 2000, 2005 Ligeia, Paris, 2005, no. 57-58-59-60, janvier-juin (in French) Influences françaises dans l’architecture et l’art de la Roumanie des XIXe et XXe siècles, Bucharest : Editura Institutului Cultural Român, 2006 (in French) D’une édification l’autre. Socialisme et nation dans l’espace (post-) communiste, Marlène Laruelle and Catherine Servant editors, Paris : PETRA Editions, 2008 (in French) Ligeia, Paris, XXII°année, n° 93-94-95-96,  juillet-décembre 2009 (in French) The She-writer’s Sofa, Mihaela Ursa editor, Cluj-Napoca: Limes, 2010 (in Romanian) Romanian Cultural Resolution, Hatje Cantz Verlag, Germany, 2011 (in German and English) Intellectuels de l’Est exilés en France, Wojciech Falkowski and Antoine Marès editors, Paris : Institut d’études slaves, 2011 Zidaru. Das Work von Marian & Victoria Ziadaru, Essen: Klartext Verlag, 2011 SAPTE. Metadecorativul/SIEBEN. Das Metadekorativismus, vol III, Bochum: Klartext, 2012 (in German, Romanian, and English)Translations into Romanian
 Christopher Merrill, Only Nails Remain. Scenes from the Balkan Wars 1992-1997, together with Radu Sava, Pitesti: Paralela 45, 2002 Catherine Durandin, Bucharest. Remembrances and Walks, together with Horia Mihail Vasilescu, Pitesti: Paralela 45, 2004 Nicole Brossard, Installations. Paralela 45/ Montreal: Les Ecrits des Forges, 2005 Pierre Oster, Alchemy of Slowliness/ Alchimie de la lenteur, Paralela 45/Gallimard, 2007References
 Jane Perlez, "Bucharest Rediscovers Houses by a Modernist. Interview with Magda Carneci", New York Review of Books, 1997, January 14. Andreas Broeckmann, Inke Arns,"Litter Media Normality in the East", Media, Berlin/Rotterdam, 1997. Adrian Guţă, "Riders on the Storm" - Performance Art in Romania between 1986 and 1996", Experiment in Romanian Art since 1960, Bucharest:CSAC, 1997, pp. 94–95. Piotr Piotrowski, "Post-War Central Europe: Art, History and Geography", Krasnogruda,Sejne - Stockholm, 1998, no.8, pp. 29–32. Mircea Cărtărescu, Romanian Postmodernism, Bucharest: Humanitas, 1999, pp. 168–169. Who's Who in Contemporary Women's Writing, edited by Jane Eldridge Miller, London and New York, Routledge, 2001. Robert Murray Davis, “Romanian Writing Redivivus”; World Literature Today, spring 2002, pp. 76–83. Fiona Sampson, "For the deaf war they're waging: Contemporary Romanian and Bessarabian Poetry", Poetry Review, vol.93, no.3, autumn 2003, pp. 51–59. Rob Pope, Creativity: History, Theory, Practice. London: Routledge, 2005, pp. 231, 269-270 (text). Deborah Schultz, "Methodological Issues: Researching Socialist Realist Romania'\", in Vojtech Lahoda, ed., Local Strategies, International Ambitions. Modern Art and Central Europe1918-1968, Prague: Artefactum, 2006, pp. 223–228. Robert Murray Davis, The Literature of Post-Communist Slovenia, Slovakia, Hungary and Romania. A Study, McFarland & Company, Inc., Publishers, 2008, Jefferson, North Carolina, and London, pp. 155–156. Piotr Piotrowski, In the Shadow of Yalta. Art and the Avant-garde in Eastern Europe, 1945-1989, Reaktion Books, London, 2009, p. 29. Cristian Vasile, Literature and Arts in Communist Romania 1948-1953, Bucharest : Humanitas, 2010. Les promesses du passé. Une histoire discontinue de l’art dans l’ex-Europe de l’Est, Centre Georges Pompidou, Paris, 2010. Ewa Izabela Nowak, L‘art face à la politique. L’art polonais dans le contexte socio-politique dans les années 1945-1970 et après 1989, Allemagne, EUE, 2010. Nena Dimitrijevic, « Cachés derrière un rideau de fer», Artpress, Paris, n°. 367, mai 2010. Ion Bogdan Lefter, A Mirror along a Road. Photograms from the Romanian Postmodernity, Pitesti: Paralela 45, 2010. Lucian Boia, Traps of History – Romanian Intellectual Elite between 1930 and 1950, Bucharest: Humanitas, 2011. Dictionnaire universel des créatrices, sous la direction de Beatrice Didier, Antoinette Fouque, Mireille Calle-Gruber, Editions des Femmes, Paris, 2013.''

External links
 Vezi biobibliografia integrală
 :ro:Magda Cârneci
 
 Personal website
 Site Atelier Imaginaire: http://www.atelier-imaginaire.com/jure.php?uid=4cb5a3683d1294eb2b7f5a0cf2e056ec&id =157&old=n&prix=&qualite=Ecrivain%20partenaire

1955 births
Romanian poets
Living people
Romanian women poets
Romanian art historians
Women art historians
Romanian women historians
Women art critics
Romanian art critics